DXNS is the callsign of two broadcast stations owned by Northern Mindanao Broadcasting System in Butuan City:

 DXNS-FM, radio station
 DXNS-TV, television station